Amaya (formerly Amaya World) is a discontinued free and open source WYSIWYG web authoring tool with browsing abilities.

It was created by a structured editor project at the INRIA, a French national research institution, and later adopted by the World Wide Web Consortium (W3C) as their testbed for web standards; a role it took over from the Arena web browser. Since the last release in January 2012, INRIA and the W3C have stopped supporting the project and active development has ceased.

Amaya has relatively low system requirements, even in comparison with other web browsers from the era of its active development period, so it has been considered a "lightweight" browser.

History
Amaya originated as a direct descendant of the Grif WYSIWYG SGML editor created in the early 1980s, and of the HTML editor Symposia, itself based on Grif, both developed and sold by French software company Grif SA.

The last change of code of Amaya was on 22 Feb 2013.

Features
 Access keys
 Caret navigation
 Page zooming
 Password management
 Spell checking
 Transport protocols
 Support for CSS, MathML, SVG, RDF and Xpointer
 Displays free and open image formats such as PNG and SVG, as well as a subset of SVG animation

A test bed application
It was used as a test-bed for new web technologies that were not supported in major browsers.

Amaya was the first client that supported the RDF annotation schema using XPointer.
The browser was available for Linux, Windows (NT and 95), Mac OS X, AmigaOS, SPARC / Solaris, AIX, OSF/1.

Naming and logo

Amaya was formerly called Tamaya. Tamaya is the name of the type of tree represented in the logo, but it was later discovered that Tamaya is also a trademark used by a French company, so the developers chose to drop the first letter to make it "Amaya".

See also

 Arena (web browser)
 Libwww
 Web design program

References

External links

 

Free HTML editors
Free software programmed in C
Free web browsers
Discontinued web browsers
Discontinued development tools
Web browsers for AmigaOS
MacOS web browsers
POSIX web browsers
Windows web browsers
1996 software
World Wide Web Consortium
Gopher clients
Software that uses wxWidgets
Software using the W3C license